Ole N. Grønsberg was a pastor, second president of Pacific Lutheran University (PLU) and a travelling missionary.

Grønsberg graduated from Luther College in Decorah, Iowa and trained at Concordia Seminary in St. Louis, Missouri. He was ordained in 1880 and was pastor of Our Saviour's Lutheran Church in San Francisco. He became PLU president, succeeding Bjug Harstad, on October 3, 1895 where he was an advisory member of the Board of Trustees and taught World History. He resigned after two years and went on to be a travelling missionary in California.

References 

Heads of universities and colleges in the United States
19th-century American people
Year of birth missing
Year of death missing
Concordia Seminary alumni